The Magicienne class was a class of twelve fifth rate 32-gun frigates of the French Navy, each with a main battery of 26 x 12-pounder long guns, and with 6 x 6-pounder guns on the quarterdeck and forecastle. They were designed by Joseph-Marie-Blaise Coulomb.

 Magicienne
Builder: Toulon
Ordered: 7 February 1777
Begun: March 1777
Launched: 1 August 1778
Completed: October 1778
Fate: captured by British Navy off Boston on 2 July 1781 and added to the British Navy.

 Précieuse
Builder:  Toulon
Ordered: 7 February 1777
Begun: March (or August?) 1777
Launched: 22 August 1778
Completed: November 1778
Fate: out of service in January 1804; broken up in July 1816.

 Sérieuse
Builder:  Toulon
Ordered: 28 August 1778
Begun: March 1779
Launched: 28 August 1779
Completed: October 1779
Fate: sunk at the Battle of Aboukir on 1 August 1798

 Lutine
Builder:  Toulon
Ordered: 23 October 1778
Begun: March 1779
Launched: 11 September 1779
Completed: November 1779
Fate: captured by British Navy in August 1793, and added to the British Navy - wrecked on 9 October 1799, her ship's bell was salvaged and still hangs in Lloyd's of London.

 Vestale
Builder:  Toulon
Ordered: 20 April 1780
Begun: May 1780
Launched: 14 October 1780
Completed: February 1781
Fate: captured by British Navy off Bordeaux on 19 August 1799.

 Alceste
Builder:  Toulon
Ordered: 20 April 1780
Begun: May 1780
Launched: 28 October 1780
Completed: February 1781
Fate: captured on 29 August 1793 by British Navy at Toulon, but retaken by the French Boudeuse on 8 June 1794, then captured again on 18 June 1799.

 Iris
Builder:  Toulon
Ordered:
Begun: May 1781
Launched: 29 October 1781
Completed: March 1782
Fate: captured in August 1793 by British Navy at Toulon, but burnt on 18 December 1793 during the evacuation.

 Réunion
Builder:  Toulon
Ordered:
Begun: February 1785
Launched: 23 February 1786
Completed: January 1787
Fate: captured by British Navy off Cherbourg on 18 October 1793, and added to the British Navy.

 Modeste
Builder:  Toulon
Ordered:
Begun: February 1785
Launched: 18 March 1786
Completed: January 1787
Fate: captured by British Navy at Genoa on 7 October 1793, and added to the British Navy.

 Sensible
Builder:  Toulon
Ordered: 23 January 1786
Begun: February 1786
Launched: 29 August 1787
Completed: March 1788
Fate: captured by British Navy off Malta on 28 June 1798, and added to the British Navy.

 Topaze
Builder:  Toulon
Ordered: 14 March 1789
Begun: August 1789
Launched: 26 September 1790
Completed: February 1791
Fate: captured by British Navy at Toulon on 29 August 1793, and added to the British Navy.

 Artémise
Builder:  Toulon
Ordered:
Begun: end 1791
Launched: 25 September 1794
Completed: November 1794
Fate: sunk at the Battle of Aboukir on 2 August 1798

References 

 Winfield, Rif and Roberts, Stephen (2015), French Warships in the Age of Sail 1786-1861: Design, Construction, Careers and Fates. Seaforth Publishing. .
 Winfield, Rif (2008) British Warships in the Age of Sail, 1714-1792: Design, Construction, Careers and Fates. Seaforth Publishing. .

Frigate classes